Johann "Jan" Studnicka (12 October 1883 – 18 October 1967) was an Austrian international footballer. He played for Wiener AC and on the Austria national team and managed several clubs. He was also competed at the 1912 Summer Olympics.

References

1883 births
1967 deaths
Association football forwards
Austrian footballers
Austria international footballers
Olympic footballers of Austria
Footballers at the 1912 Summer Olympics
Austrian football managers
FC Zürich managers
First Vienna FC managers
Wiener AC players
Austrian expatriate football managers
Expatriate football managers in Switzerland
Footballers from Vienna